James William Hyatt (September 19, 1837 – March 12, 1893) was Treasurer of the United States from 1887 to 1889. He had previously served as Bank Commissioner for the State of Connecticut, and United States Bank Examiner for Connecticut and Rhode Island. He served as a Democratic member of the Connecticut House of Representatives in 1875 and 1876, a member of the Connecticut Senate in 1884, and he was Warden of the Borough of Norwalk from 1877 to 1878, from 1880 to 1882, and from 1885 to 1887.

Biography
James W. Hyatt was born in Norwalk, Connecticut, the son of James W. Hyatt, and Laura Gray on September 19, 1837. With the outbreak of the American Civil War in 1861, Hyatt joined the 5th Regiment Connecticut Volunteer Infantry. After the war, he moved to New York City to join Lockwood & Co., a leading banking house that was founded by LeGrand Lockwood of Norwalk.

In 1873, Hyatt attained control of the majority of stock of the Norwalk Horse Railway Company and returned to Norwalk to work as its Secretary and General Manager.  He was president of the company at the time of his death.  He also worked as Vice President of the Danbury and Norwalk Railroad, and, in 1881, became its president.  He represented Norwalk in the Connecticut House of Representatives in 1875 and 1876 as a Democrat (Hyatt had earlier supported the Republican Party, but became a Democrat in 1872). In 1876, Governor of Connecticut Charles Roberts Ingersoll appointed Hyatt Bank Commissioner.  He was later reappointed by Govs. Richard D. Hubbard, Charles B. Andrews, Hobart B. Bigelow, and Thomas M. Waller. In 1884, he was elected to the Connecticut Senate, but resigned so he could remain Bank Commissioner.

In 1886, President of the United States Grover Cleveland appointed Hyatt United States Bank Examiner for Connecticut and Rhode Island. In spring 1887, President Cleveland appointed Hyatt Treasurer of the United States, with Hyatt subsequently holding that office from May 24, 1887 to May 10, 1889.

After suffering for several weeks from gout and Bright's disease, Hyatt died at Norwalk on March 12, 1893. Surprising observers, who assumed that Hyatt was rich, Hyatt died a poor man and left virtually no estate for his widow.

References

1837 births
1893 deaths
Democratic Party Connecticut state senators
Mayors of Norwalk, Connecticut
People of Connecticut in the American Civil War
Democratic Party members of the Connecticut House of Representatives
Treasurers of the United States
Military personnel from Connecticut
19th-century American politicians